Dhruma or Darma is a small town located  by road northwest of Riyadh, Saudi Arabia.  It is the center of the small Dhurma Governorate of Riyadh Province, and had a population of 10,267 people according to the 2004 census.
   It lies in the wide Al-Batin valley, which it shares with its larger twin, Muzahmiyya.

History
The town appears in the 7th century poetry of Jarir as "Qarma" or "Garma", and is also mentioned by the same name in Yaqut's encyclopedia. It is unknown, however, when exactly the name evolved into "Dhurma". The village was important in pre-20th century Nejd as a western gateway to the region of Wadi Hanifa, which includes Riyadh and Diriyah, and often bore the brunt of the military campaigns directed at the region. Its traditional rulers were distant cousins of the Al Saud family, and Dhurma joined the First Saudi State at the end of the 18th century. A large invasion of Saudi-ruled territory by the Yam tribe of Najran, some 1000 km to the south, was repelled by the people of Dhurma in 1775 after an intense battle fought in a nearby forest of palm trees.

Later, the Egyptian-Ottoman forces of Ibrahim Pasha placed the town under siege on their way to the Saudi capital of Diriyah (see Saudi-Ottoman War). Dhurma offered remarkably stout resistance to the invading army, and even rejected Ibrahim's offer of a truce in exchange for allowing him to proceed to Diriyah. The town, however, surrendered in early 1818 and Ibrahim's retribution was especially harsh, allowing his troops to pillage the village with impunity. The town revived somewhat after those events, and was reported by Philby to have had a population of nearly 6,000 in 1917. Its fortunes have fallen dramatically in recent decades, however, because it was bypassed by the modern Riyadh-Mecca highway, and most of its original inhabitants have moved to neighboring Riyadh.

Climate

References

Yaqut Al-Hamawi, Mu'jam Al-Buldan
Ibn Ghannam, Rawdhat Al-Afkar wal Afham (a history of Nejd)
Philby, St. John B., The Heart of Arabia: A Record of Travel & Exploration, Vol. 1, p. 126, G.P. Putnam's Sons, NY and London, 1923.

External links
Website

Populated places in Riyadh Province